Christine Chin (born 1974), better known by her stage names Sasha and Sista Sasha, is a Jamaican dancehall recording artist, presently recording gospel music.

Born in Kingston, Jamaica, she was raised in Queens, New York City. Her first big hit was Dat Sexy Body. In 1998, she wrote "Dat Sexy Body", composed on a variation of the "Bookshelf" riddim, which was later remixed with famous reggaeton artist Ivy Queen. Her biggest hit is "I'm Still in Love with You" with fellow dancehall musician Sean Paul.

In the 2000s, she started a hair salon business. She became a Christian in 2008 and changed her stage name, and stated that she would no longer perform the songs that made her famous.

Career

Early career and Come Again 
She wrote her first rap at age 11, and as a student at August Martin High School, the young teen first performed professionally at Brooklyn's Biltmore Ballroom, modelling herself after such childhood idols as rap's greatest female act, Salt-N-Pepa, as well as Jamaican female rapper Shelly Thunder.
Then, all at once, Sasha went from being a student and "popular chick" in class to a professional. "We snuck out to see Shabba Ranks, and he was calling for a girl to get onstage and dance. All my friends were yelling out, 'She doesn't want to dance, she wants to sing!'" Sasha took the mic and busted a freestyle that brought down the house. Shabba's management, being so impressed with her display invited her to make some demo recordings, right then and there. Not two weeks went by before Steely & Clevie, computer dancehall's whiz team, heard her demos and sought her out in New York.  They flew her to Jamaica to write and cut her first record, the hardcore rap "Kill the Bitch." The album was released by Island on the Bogle compilation alongside tracks by established stars Buju Banton and Papa San. Sasha's track was picked as a standout by stateside DJs, and it has played for literally years in the hip-hop underground. At 16, Sasha was touring worldwide with all of dancehall's biggest names, and learning her craft through a variety of experiences.
Sasha released her debut album titled "Come Again" in 1997 on Anchor Records.

"Dat Sexy Body", "I'm Still in Love with You", and Sexy Body Sasha 
Sasha showed another surprising aspect of her talent in 1998, when her cut on the "Bookshelf" rhythm, "Dat Sexy Body," hit clubs and radio. "I transformed! I really gave it to them straight-up hardcore street in 'Kill the Bitch;' then I started working with Tony Kelly, he noticed something in my voice, and asked me to try singing. He pulled something out of me that I didn't know I really had, different from my church singing. I didn't know I could sing in such a high key; Tony pulled me to the edge. Sometimes you don't recognize it yourself, but it was just in me." Now, after a full four years of being a club and radio mix-show classic, "Dat Sexy Body" has resurfaced as a major chart contender, with massive Miami crossover airplay spreading to the West Coast and Northeast. A Spanish version of "Dat Sexy Body" is also in the works for immediate release. Sasha's third international hit returned her to the studio with Steely & Clevie in a duet with Sean Paul, "I'm Still in Love," which shot to Number One in the reggae clubs of Jamaica, London, Miami and New York. It is slated to be a future single from Sean's double-platinum album Dutty Rock, and a video, directed by Little X, has been filmed and is ready for MTV, BET, and all other music video stations. Sean and Sasha perform a snappy updated combination treatment of Alton Ellis' Studio One classic (best known globally through Althea and Donna's 1978 version "Uptown Top Ranking"). Sasha embraces the girl-group tradition from the Supremes to Love Unlimited, I-Three and En Vogue, and brings it into dancehall with a multi-tracked performance that's at once melodious, precise and soulful. With the broadest range of vocal styles at her command, Sasha says she's in the studio getting her focus on an album that will reflect all her facets. She'll be back at work with trusted hit-makers Tony Kelly and Steely & Clevie, while joining such A-list dancehall producers as Jeremy Harding, Big Yard and Black Shadow's Troyton (producer of Sean Paul's "Gimme the Light")."There's a hardcore Sasha, and there's a Lauryn Hill sort of laid-back side that everyone can sing along with," she says. "Then there's another set of fans that want this high voice, 'I would like to get to know you,' like in 'Sexy Body.' 'I'm Still in Love' is a subtle Sasha; aSashand those fans might not know the hardcore Sasha at all. So I look into the crowd and feel the people, and then Iknow how to work my show. And sometimes I tease them and introduce them to the other side of Sasha."
Sasha's intuition and sensitivity about her audience is reinforced by her innate cultural connection to both the Jamaican and American audiences. "In dancehall, the crossover market appreciates you, and dances to the beat, but they don't always know what you're saying. Even though I'm writing dancehall, my schooling was in New York, and the way I write and flow my words, all of people can understand the lyrical content of what I'm saying."

Sasha has also had a string of hits in Jamaica, including "Runaway With Me", "Hot Girls", "Natural High", "Wine Gal Wine", and We Got The Love (Feat. Turbulence). Sasha was also working on an album for VP Records titled "Sexy Body Sasha" which was supposed to be released in 2006 but Sasha left the label and the album got shelved. The songs from the album will soon be released as a mixtape under the same title.

Transition to gospel music, "Breaking Free", and TryGod Records 
Early 2008, saw Sasha transition into a Gospel artist and as a result of her new outlook on life, Sasha said she will not perform any of the songs that made her popular. She was known for songs like Natty On Mi Frontline and We Got The Love, which were done with her former lover, Turbulence, as well as a remake of Alton Ellis' I'm Still In Love, which she did with Sean Paul. As a Christian, Sasha sang on the Beauty of Holiness Gospel Band, which she formed about five years ago. Since then, the band has performed mainly on the north coast. They also have a song called Surround Me. However, the band's first major appearance will be at Gospel Explosion.
Sasha released her first album in 17 years titled "Breaking Free" on 8 April 2014.

In June 2014, Sasha signed with TryGod Records.

Discography

Albums 
 1997: Come Again
 2006: Sexy Body Sasha (Shelved)
2009: Pleasure (Shelved)
 2014: Breaking Free
 2021: Pree Life TBR

Singles 
1993: Kill the Bitch
1995: In & Out
1996: Come Again
1997: Black or White
1997: Girls
1998: Dat Sexy Body
2001: Poppy
2002: Can You Please Me
2004: Run Dung Me
2004: I'm Still in Love with You (with Sean Paul)
2004: Dat Sexy Body (re-release)
2005: Coca Cola Shape/Dat Sexy Body (Remix) (feat. Ivy Queen)
2006: Natural High
2006: Wine Gal Wine
2006: I Like the Way (feat. Pitbull)
2008: Black or White (feat. Eddie Dee)
2009: Pleasure
2012: Chosen
2013: Get Through It
2013: I Am Anointed
2014: Nutten No Sweet Like

References 

Living people
Jamaican dancehall musicians
Jamaican reggae musicians
1974 births
Place of birth missing (living people)
Musicians from Kingston, Jamaica
People from Brooklyn
Jamaican Christians
VP Records artists
Atlantic Records artists